The Sumatran drongo (Dicrurus sumatranus) is a passerine bird in the family Dicruridae. It was formerly considered conspecific with the hair-crested drongo. It is endemic to the island of Sumatra in Indonesia. Its natural habitat is subtropical or tropical moist lowland forests. It is threatened by habitat loss.

References

Sumatran drongo
Birds of Sumatra
Sumatran drongo
Sumatran drongo
Taxonomy articles created by Polbot